Getting Her Man is a 1924 silent film comedy starring Ora Carew. The independent Renown Pictures released the film. A print is preserved at the Library of Congress.

Cast 
 Ora Carew as Doris Stanton
 Jay Morley as Ben Daniels
 Arthur Wellington as Warren Bates
 Hal Stephens as Bates' assistant

References

External links 
 
 

1924 films
American silent feature films
1924 comedy films
Silent American comedy films
American black-and-white films
1920s American films